Peter Nørklit (born 13 February 1971) is a Danish handballer, currently the veteran goalkeeper of Danish Handball League side FCK Håndbold. He has previously played for the Spanish clubs Portland San Antonio and BM Altea. During the 1990s and the beginning of the 2000s, Nørklit was the first choice as goalkeeper of the Danish national handball team.

External links
 player info

1971 births
Living people
Liga ASOBAL players
Danish male handball players
SDC San Antonio players